The Legislative Chamber of Federal District is the unicameral legislative branch of Federal District in Brazil.

The Constitution of 1967 gave to the Federal Senate the legislative branch of the Federal District, after the Constitution of 1988, the Legislative Chamber was created, The first legislature began on January 1, 1991. It accumulates legislative powers of state and municipality at the same time.

External links
Official website

Legislative Chamber of the Federal District (Brazil)
Federal District (Brazil)
Federal District (Brazil)
Federal District (Brazil)